The Feast of the Prayer of Christ is a former feast of the Roman Catholic liturgical year.

References

Catholic holy days